Guerrant House is a historic home located near Arvonia, Buckingham County, Virginia. It was built about 1835, and consists of a -story, two room frame house with a separate kitchen set perpendicular to the rear of the main block.  It features typical Federal period decorative and construction details.  They include beaded weatherboards, a boxed cornice with dentils, and shouldered chimneys.

It was listed on the National Register of Historic Places in 2000.

References

Federal architecture in Virginia
Houses completed in 1835
Houses on the National Register of Historic Places in Virginia
Houses in Buckingham County, Virginia
National Register of Historic Places in Buckingham County, Virginia